The Læsø List is a local political party in Denmark, set in Læsø Municipality.

Politicians from the Læsø List
Thomas W. Olsen. Mayor in Læsø Municipality, from 2010 to 2013.
Bent Bjørn. Deputy mayor in Læsø Municipality, from 2010.

Election results

Municipal elections

External links 
 Election results from Læsø Municipality

Local political parties in Denmark
Political parties with year of establishment missing